Aluminium lactate is a chemical compound, a salt of aluminium and lactic acid with the formula Al(C3H5O3)3.

Synthesis
Aluminium lactate is obtained by precipitating a solution of the barium salt by aluminium sulfate.

Physical properties
Aluminium lactate appears as a white powder which is soluble in water.

Use
Aluminium lactate is used as a mordant. 

It is suitable for use in both the cosmetic and oral industries.

Aluminium lactate is also used as a precursor for sol–gel synthesis of alumina-based glasses.

References

Lactates
Aluminium compounds